Acastus (Ancient Greek: Ἄκαστος) is a character in Greek mythology.  He sailed with Jason and the Argonauts, and participated in the hunt for the Calydonian Boar.

Family
Acastus was the son of Pelias, then king of Iolcus, and Anaxibia (Philomache in some traditions). Acastus with his wife Astydameia (also called Hippolyte, daughter of Cretheus) had two daughters: Sterope and Laodamia, and a number of sons. Another daughter, Sthenele, was given by the Bibliotheca as the wife of Menoetius and mother of Patroclus.

Mythology
After the return of the Argonauts, Acastus's sisters were manipulated by Medea to cut their father Pelias in pieces and boil them. Acastus, when he heard this, buried his father, and drove Jason and Medea from Iolcus (and, according to Pausanias, his sisters also), and instituted funeral games in honor of his father.  He thereafter became king of Iolcus.

Acastus purified Peleus of the murder of King Eurytion of Phthia. Acastus's wife (variously named in mythology; often Astydameia, but sometimes Hippolyte, daughter of Cretheus) fell in love with Peleus but he scorned her. Bitter, she sent a messenger to Antigone, Peleus's wife and daughter of Eurytion, to tell her that Peleus was to marry Acastus's daughter, Sterope.

Astydameia then told Acastus that Peleus had tried to rape her. Acastus took Peleus on a hunting trip and hid his sword while he slept, then abandoned him on Mt. Pelion to be killed by centaurs.  The wise centaur Chiron (or the god Hermes) returned Peleus' sword and Peleus managed to escape. With Jason and the Dioscuri, Peleus sacked Iolcus, dismembered Astydameia (and, in some accounts, Acastus himself), and marched his army between the pieces. Their kingdom later fell to Jason's son Thessalus.

Notes

References 
Apollodorus, The Library with an English Translation by Sir James George Frazer, F.B.A., F.R.S. in 2 Volumes, Cambridge, MA, Harvard University Press; London, William Heinemann Ltd. 1921. ISBN 0-674-99135-4. Online version at the Perseus Digital Library. Greek text available from the same website.
Gaius Julius Hyginus, Fabulae from The Myths of Hyginus translated and edited by Mary Grant. University of Kansas Publications in Humanistic Studies. Online version at the Topos Text Project.
Graves, Robert, The Greek Myths, Harmondsworth, London, England, Penguin Books, 1960. 
Graves, Robert, The Greek Myths: The Complete and Definitive Edition. Penguin Books Limited. 2017. 
Pausanias, Description of Greece with an English Translation by W.H.S. Jones, Litt.D., and H.A. Ormerod, M.A., in 4 Volumes. Cambridge, MA, Harvard University Press; London, William Heinemann Ltd. 1918. . Online version at the Perseus Digital Library
Pausanias, Graeciae Descriptio. 3 vols. Leipzig, Teubner. 1903.  Greek text available at the Perseus Digital Library.
Pindar, Odes translated by Diane Arnson Svarlien. 1990. Online version at the Perseus Digital Library.
Pindar, The Odes of Pindar including the Principal Fragments with an Introduction and an English Translation by Sir John Sandys, Litt.D., FBA. Cambridge, MA., Harvard University Press; London, William Heinemann Ltd. 1937. Greek text available at the Perseus Digital Library.
Publius Ovidius Naso, Metamorphoses translated by Brookes More (1859-1942). Boston, Cornhill Publishing Co. 1922. Online version at the Perseus Digital Library.
Publius Ovidius Naso, Metamorphoses. Hugo Magnus. Gotha (Germany). Friedr. Andr. Perthes. 1892. Latin text available at the Perseus Digital Library.

Argonauts
Kings of Iolcus
Characters in the Argonautica